Erelieva parvulella is a species of snout moth in the genus Erelieva. It was described by Charles Russell Ely in 1910. It is found in North America, including Illinois and Tennessee.

References

Moths described in 1910
Phycitinae